Christ's Church, Tangxi is a Protestant church located in Tangxi, Hangzhou, Zhejiang, China.

History 
The church was originally built in 1899 by Scottish missionary Jin Lede, and served as parish church of the Presbyterian Church in the United States of America in the region.

References

Further reading 
 

Churches in Hangzhou
1899 establishments in China
Churches completed in 1899
Tourist attractions in Hangzhou
Protestant churches in China